Laura Dell'Angelo (born 17 May 1981) is an Italian former professional tennis player.

Biography
Dell'Angelo was born in Munich, to a German mother and Italian father.

On the professional tour, she reached a best ranking of 175 in the world. She won three ITF singles titles, including a $25,000 tournament in Orbetello in 1999, beating Anastasia Myskina in the final. In 2000, she featured in the qualifying draw of all four Grand Slam events.

As a doubles player, Dell'Angelo had a best ranking of 245 and was a quarterfinalist at Helsinki in 2003.

ITF Circuit finals

Singles (3–3)

Doubles: 9 (3–6)

References

External links
 
 

1981 births
Living people
Italian female tennis players
German people of Italian descent
Tennis players from Munich